(EYD: ,  'People's Daily') was an Indonesian newspaper published by the Communist Party of Indonesia (PKI) from 1951 to 1965. Harian Rakyat was managed by Njoto as a member of the editorial board and Mula Naibaho as editor in chief. It was one of the controversial communist newspapers in Indonesia.

History

Early history 
 was first published on 31 January 1951, and was originally named  ( 'People's Voice'). In its heyday,  was the most popular political newspaper ever published in Indonesia, with average circulation of 23,000 copies in the 1950s and 1960s. The newspaper was sold at a retail and subscription price of Rp 0.60 and Rp 14.5 a month, respectively.

Bans and closure 
With its confrontational style,  always opposed other parties and the authorities. Because its message was considered to have violated the rules imposed by the government of the time,  was occasionally banned. The first ban occurs lasted for 23 hours, between 13 September 1957, at 21.00 and 14 September 1957, at 20:00.

The ban was repeated on 16 July 1959, for a month because the paper published the PKI Central Committee statement of 3 July, entitled "Evaluation after one year of the Working Cabinet does not guarantee the implementation of the 3 chapters program, so they should be retooled immediately". On w August 1959, a month after the ban,  returned to print. On 2 November 1959, the newspaper was banned again by the War Authority. This time, the reason was not so clear. This led to the  circulation expansion led by PKI officials D.N. Aidit, M.H. Lukman, and other PKI activists, who directly took to the streets.
On 9 December 1959,  was banned again for a story about "Njoto's 23 November lecture in the SBKA building", which was published on 24 November 1959. The reason for banning was also not clear, giving rise to protests. Following pressure,  was finally permitted, and published again on 23 December 1959 .
In his address, Aidit raised the question of democracy and political freedom. According to the War Authority, this could disrupt political stability in Indonesia.

On 3 October 1965,  finally ceased publication. It was not only disbanded: all the PKI members and activists who supported the newspaper were hunted down, arrested, imprisoned, and even killed. The final words from the editor to its readers were, "Many-many thanks, all the readers!"

Journalism style 
It editorials were confrontational, leading to conflicts with other media. It always took a bold and offensive stance against its opponents. Its simple, agile, and forthright language style – in accordance with the teachings of Marxism and Leninism – was easily understood by the peasants and workers who were the basis of the PKI support.

Harian Rakyat was seen as the defender of the Sukarno's Political Manifesto (Manipol). While the right-wing or conservative newspapers were not too concerned about the manifesto,  became the manifesto's propaganda mouthpiece. It remained anti-imperialist, and considered the right-wing newspapers to have insulted Sukarno for not supporting the manifesto.  took the stance that it would not publish any writing that was contrary to the ideas of the revolution.

Notes

References 
 
 
 

Defunct newspapers published in Indonesia
Publications established in 1951
Publications disestablished in 1965
1951 establishments in Indonesia
1965 disestablishments in Indonesia
Communist newspapers